All the Things I Never Said is the debut extended play (EP) by English indie pop band Pale Waves. It was released on 20 February 2018 by Dirty Hit. All the Things I Never Said includes reworked versions of the band's early demos, "The Tide" and "Heavenly", alongside the newer songs, "New Year's Eve" and "My Obsession".

Originally titled New Year's Eve (after the EP's first track), the record had been tentatively scheduled for release on 18 January 2018 before being pushed back to 20 February, whereupon the EP was renamed. All four tracks on the EP were released as singles, with "New Year's Eve", released on 7 November 2017, serving as the lead single. The EP peaked at number one on both the UK Physical Singles Chart and the UK Vinyl Singles Chart. The EP also ranked at 31 on the year-end UK Vinyl Singles Top 40 chart.

Recording and release
The EP was recorded in late 2017 and produced by Jonathan Gilmore.

Two of the tracks on the EP – "The Tide" and "Heavenly"—are among the band's earliest compositions. In 2015, the band had released early recordings of both songs via SoundCloud, and they also included these early recordings on a CD-R demo tape that they sold through the internet. These demo tracks were produced prior to guitarist Hugo Silvani and bassist Charlie Wood joining the band, and upon their initial release, they caught the attention of XFM radio broadcaster John Kennedy. Kennedy in turn notified the independent label Dirty Hit, who subsequently signed the band onto their roster.

In a discussion with Billboard magazine about the decision to re-record their earlier songs, Heather Baron-Gracie, the band's lead singer and vocalist, explained:

I like the fact that they are on the EP, because they were relevant at a time. They remind me of a time where I was like that, innocent, and the position I was in. I never really want to let those songs go. For them to go on our first EP is really special. A lot of the fans have heard these songs. I think they're really going to be overwhelmed we put them on there. A lot of people thought we'd pick them up and throw them away, but we didn't. We gave them back to [the fans].

Promotion and singles 
The first single from the EP, "New Year's Eve", was released on 7 November 2017. On 15 December 2017, the track entered into contemporary hit radio rotation in the United Kingdom. The music video for the track was directed by Stephen Agnew and was released on 5 December 2017. The video features the band at a New Year's Eve party where they are the only guests and performers. While the band received several treatments for the video, it was Agnew's that caught their attention, as it was closest to the band's initial vision.

The second single, "My Obsession", was released digitally on 13 December 2017, one day after premiering on Zane Lowe's Beats 1 show. The music video for the song was released on 18 December 2017. The video, shot in conjunction with the video for "New Year's Eve" over two days, was also directed by Agnew. The video features Baron-Gracie living with a mannequin as the object of her obsession, bathing with it and holding it close like a loved one. Speaking to The Fader about the video, Baron-Gracie said, "I wanted to create an uncomfortable, voyeuristic experience for the viewer [so as] to make them feel they are intruding on a world they shouldn't be a part of. Ultimately, it is a representation of desperation, loneliness and grief."

On 31 January 2018, "The Tide" premiered on Lowe's Beats 1 show as part of his "World Record" feature, and it was released as a digital single the following day. The music video for "The Tide" premiered on 7 February 2018 and was directed by Andy Deluca. The video features live shots interspersed with backstage footage. The footage was taken from the band's headlining tour across North America in November and December 2017.

The EP's final single, "Heavenly", premiered on BBC Radio 1's show Annie Mac and was named the "Hottest Record in the World" on 19 February 2018. On 23 March, it was serviced to UK contemporary hit radio. The video for the song was released on 19 March 2018. Directed by Adam Powell, it features Baron-Gracie dressed in a latex catsuit attached to numerous wires being controlled and pulled in several directions. Intermixed with this footage are clips of Baron-Gracie miming the song against a white background. This video had its world premier on the Wonderland website.

Critical reception 

Critical reception to the EP has been largely positive. Thomas Smith of NME praised the release as "a vivid 15-minute scrapbook of [the band's] journey thus far." Smith argued that the release "pushed the band's sound into daring new ground", and that its tracks were affectively moving. Dave Beech of The Line of Best Fit awarded the album an eight out of ten, describing the EP as "four tracks of effortless indie-pop; its silky-smooth pop licks and sugar sweet vocal delivery masking a darkness that seems inherent to Pale Waves’ genetic make-up." While noting that some listeners might dislike the record's overt pop sensibilities, Beech wrote that it is "impossible to deny how much fun [Pale Waves's] music is".

Aurora Henni Grogh of Riot magazine wrote that the album was rich "with heartfelt lyrics that take us through the bitter-sweet landscape of romance", and that the EP as a whole "makes you wish you were young and in love". Grogh further complimented the record's melodies, guitar tone, and "intimacy" of its lyrics. Conversely, Grogh wrote that the EP "makes you yearn for more [musical] diversity" and that "Pale Waves need to show more" in the future. Ally Tatosian of MXDWN wrote that, with All the Things I Never Said, Pale Waves "have created their own twist on the classic happy-sad vibe most indie-pop bands have successfully aged over the years". Baron-Gracie's writing, Tatosian further wrote, is "overflowing [with an] abundance of raw emotion", as best evidenced in the lyrics to "My Obsession" and "Heavenly".

Reception to the singles was largely positive. Writing for Clash magazine, reviewer Robin Murray called "New Year's Eve" "engagingly bittersweet" and said that the song's "storming chorus could [have been] lifted straight from the end credits of a John Hughes movie". DIY magazine likewise called "New Year's Eve" a "shimmering pop gem with a melancholy twist as the soaring hook". In a review of the second single, "My Obsession", Murray called the track "endearingly open" and "Pale Waves at their best – honest, reflective, and gently anthemic". DIY similarly called "My Obsession" "another storming goth-pop sensation" whose "crunching riffs, jangly guitar melodies and a killer pop hook [explode] seemingly from nowhere". Thomas Smith of NME called the EP's third single, "The Tide" an "indie-pop banger", and the music review staff of Platform magazine described the song as a "feel-good ... dreamy, 80s inspired track". Finally, Laurence Day of The Line of Best Fit described the record's final single, "Heavenly", as "effortlessly charming from start to end, with the euphoric chorus built to soundtrack memories of misspent youth and summer frolics and classic coming-of-age movies from decades past".

Commercial performance 
Initially, slated to be released on 18 January 2018 under the title New Year's Eve, All the Things I Never Said was officially released on 20 February 2018 by Dirty Hit. The initial release was digital download-only, but on 16 March 2018, a vinyl version of the record was also released.

Track listing

Personnel

Pale Waves
 Heather Baron-Gracie – lead vocals, rhythm guitar
 Ciara Doran – drums
 Hugo Silvani – lead guitar, keyboard
 Charlie Wood – bass guitar, keyboard

Technical personnel
 Art Direction – Samuel Burgess-Johnson
 Producers – Jon Gilmore

Charts

Weekly charts

Year-end charts

Release history

References

2018 debut EPs
Indie pop EPs
Pale Waves albums